BFF Elite Football Academy is a Bangladeshi youth development football academy based on Dhaka, Bangladesh. Established in 2021, it is operated by the Bangladesh Football Federation, with the goal of developing young players for the future and nurturing young Bangladeshi talents. The academy team participates in Bangladesh Championship League, country’s second tier football league. However, they will not be subject to promotion or relegation regardless of their position in the points table of the league.

History

The academy started with 51 under-15 footballers in September, 2021. The players were selected through nationwide trial. The current age level of the academy is under-18. The academy is situated at Bir Sherestha Shaheed Shipahi Mostafa Kamal Stadium of Dhaka, Bangladesh. BFF Elite Football Academy has officially started their journey 12 September, 2021. 

On 29 December 2021, Bangladesh Football Federation has announced the academy team will be part of upcoming Bangladesh Championship League to give the academy players regular playing time in competitive football and monitor their improvement and. They have started preparation for the league. Former assistant coach of Bangladesh U-19 and Bangladesh U-16 and current coach of the academy, Rashed Ahmed Pappu, appointed as the head coach of the academy team for the league.

On 20 February 2022, the BFF Elite Academy team played their first ever professional game. They defeated previous years runners up NoFeL SC by 2–1 in the opening match of the 2021–22 Bangladesh Championship League. Both goals were scored by Mirajul Islam. On 12 April 2022, the BFF Elite Academy produced their first BPL player, as the clubs top scorer during the first leg of the Championship season, Mirajul Islam joined Dhaka Mohammedan.

Current squad
BFF Elite Football Academy squad for 2022–23 season.

Team records

Academy head coach records

Personnel

Current technical staff

References

Football clubs in Bangladesh
Football academies in Asia
Youth football in Bangladesh
2021 establishments in Bangladesh
Sport in Bangladesh
Dhaka